Eois phaneroscia is a moth in the  family Geometridae. It is found in the north-eastern Himalayas and Sundaland. The habitat consists of lowland alluvial forests, hill dipterocarp forests, lower montane forests and scrubby montane forests.

References

Moths described in 1922
Eois
Moths of Asia